Charlton Griffin is a voiceover actor and audiobook narrator, as well as owner of Audio Connoisseur, an audiobook publishing company. He primarily records audiobooks of literary classics and is considered "the voice of Sherlock Holmes." He has won four Earphone Awards and five Audie Awards.

Awards

References 

21st-century male actors
Male voice actors
Year of birth missing (living people)
Living people
Audiobook narrators